Ferdinando Ughelli (21 March 1595 – 19 May 1670) was an Italian Cistercian monk and church historian.

Biography
He was born in Florence. He entered the Cistercian Order and was sent to the Gregorian University in Rome, where he studied under the Jesuits Francesco Piccolomini and John de Lugo.
 
He filled many important posts in his order, being Abbot of Badia a Settimo near Florence, and, from 1638, Abbot of Tre Fontane in Rome. He was skilled in ecclesiastical history. To encourage him in this work and to defray the expense of the journeys it entailed, Pope Alexander VII granted him an annual pension of 500 scudi. He was a consultor of the Index Librorum Prohibitorum and theologian to Cardinal Carlo de' Medici; he was frequently offered the episcopal dignity, which he refused.

He died in Rome in 1670 and was buried in his abbatial church.

Literary works
His chief work is Italia sacra sive de episcopis Italiae (9 vols, 1643–1662), re-edited with corrections and additions by Nicola Coleti (1717–1722), with a tenth volume. In compiling this work, he frequently had to deal with matters not previously treated by historians; as a result, the Italia sacra, owing to the imperfections of historical science in Ughelli's day, especially from the point of view of criticism and diplomatics, contains serious errors, particularly as the author was more intent on collecting than on weighing documents. Nevertheless, his work with all its imperfections was necessary to facilitate the labours of critical historians of a later day, and is consulted even now. In the last volume of the Italia sacra he published various historical sources until then unedited.

Among his other writings are:
 Cardinalium elogia ex sacro ordine cisterciensi (1624): writings in praise of cardinals of his order and the papal privileges granted to it;
 Columnensis familiae cardinalium imagines (1650): biographies of cardinals of the Colonna family.
 genealogical works on the Counts of Marsciano (1667) and the Capizucchi (1653);
 Aggiunte ("additions") to the Vitae et res gestae pontificum by Ciaconius (Alphonsus Ciacconius).

Notes

References

Further reading 
 
 Denys Hay, Muratori and British Historians, in L.A. Muratori storiografo, Atti del Convegno internazionale di studi muratoriani, Modena 1972, Firenze 1975, pp. 323–39.
 
 

1595 births
1670 deaths
Writers from Florence
Italian abbots
17th-century Italian Roman Catholic priests
Italian Cistercians
17th-century Italian historians